The Colorado Football Association (CFA), or Colorado Intercollegiate Athletic Conference,  was one of the earliest college football conferences in the United States, with its membership centered on the state of Colorado. The league existed from 1890 to 1908. After folding in 1908, all of its members subsequently founded the Rocky Mountain Athletic Conference, which remains in existence today as a Division II conference.

Champions
Membership varied from three to five teams each year.  The following is a list of annual champions.

1890 – Colorado Mines
1891 – Colorado Mines
1892 – Colorado Mines
1893 – Colorado Mines
1894 – Colorado
1895 – Colorado
1896 – Colorado

1897 – Colorado
1898 – Colorado Mines
1899 – Colorado College
1900 – Colorado College
1901 – Colorado
1902 – Colorado

1903 – Colorado
1904 – Colorado Mines
1905 – Colorado Mines 
1906 – Colorado Mines
1907 – Colorado Mines
1908 – Colorado & Denver

See also
 List of Colorado Football Association standings
 List of defunct college football conferences

References

 
Defunct college sports conferences in the United States
Sports leagues established in 1890
Sports leagues disestablished in 1908
1890 establishments in Colorado
1908 disestablishments in Colorado